Anderson Ribeiro Mendes (born July 2, 1981) is a Brazilian football player, who was invited to Ukraine by FC Arsenal Kharkiv's chairman Chumak during his vacation trip to Brazil. Ribeiro quickly became fan's favourite of nearly all teams in Kharkiv being the first Brazilian ever played for these teams. In the summer of 2009 he joined Maltese club Tarxien Rainbows FC. In 2010 Ribeiro return to Ukraine and signed with FC Metalurh Zaporizhya In 2015 is playing in Gozo for Kercem Ajax F.C. in the 1st Division. Currently he is playing in Gozo for Oratory Youths F.C. in the 1st Division.

External links
 

Brazilian footballers
Association football forwards
Brazilian expatriate footballers
Expatriate footballers in Ukraine
Brazilian expatriate sportspeople in Ukraine
Expatriate footballers in Malta
1981 births
Living people
FC Arsenal Kharkiv players
FC Helios Kharkiv players
FC Metalist Kharkiv players
FC Kharkiv players
FC Metalurh Zaporizhzhia players
Ukrainian Premier League players
Ukrainian First League players
Ukrainian Second League players
Footballers from Porto Alegre